This article lists the results for the sport of Squash in 2016.

 January 2 – December 3: 2016 World Squash Federation Schedule

World squash championships
 April 23 – 30: 2015 Women's World Open Squash Championship in  Kuala Lumpur
  Nour El Sherbini defeated  Laura Massaro 6–11, 4–11, 11–3, 11–5, 11–8, to win her first Women's World Open Squash Championship title.
 August 6 – 11: 2016 World Junior Squash Championships for Men and Women in  Bielsko-Biała
 Men:  Eain Yow Ng defeated  Saadeldin Abouaish, 11–3, 9–11, 11–7, 11–5, to win his first World Junior Squash Championships title.
 Women:  Nouran Gohar defeated fellow Egyptian, Rowan Reda Araby, 11–5, 11–6, 11–7, to win her second consecutive World Junior Squash Championships title.
 August 12 – 17: 2016 Men’s World Junior Team Squash Championship in  Bielsko-Biała
  defeated , 2–1 in matches played, to win their fifth Men’s World Junior Team Squash Championship title.
 August 15 – 19: 2016 World International Doubles Squash Championships in  Darwin, Northern Territory
 Men's Doubles:  Alan Clyne & Greg Lobban
 Women's Doubles:  Joelle King & Amanda Landers-Murphy
 Mixed Doubles:  Joelle King & Paul Coll
 September 5 – 11: 2016 World University Squash Championship in  Kuala Lumpur
 Men:  Tsz Fung Yip
 Women:  Wee Wern Low
 Team: 
 September 24 – 30: 2016 World Masters Squash Championships in  Johannesburg
 For results, click here and go to Draws and Results tab.
 October 30 – November 6: 2016 Men's World Open Squash Championship in  Cairo
  Karim Abdel Gawad defeated fellow Egyptian, Ramy Ashour, 5–11, 11–6, 11–7, 2–1 (retired), to win his first Men's World Open Squash Championship title.
 November 27 – December 3: 2016 Women's World Team Squash Championships in  Issy-les-Moulineaux
  defeated , 2–1 in matches played, to win their third Women's World Team Squash Championships title.

2015–16 PSA World Series
 October 10 – 17, 2015: 2015 U.S. Open in  Philadelphia
 Men:  Grégory Gaultier defeated  Omar Mosaad 11–6, 11–3, 11–5, to win his third U.S. Open title.
 Women:  Laura Massaro defeated  Nour El Tayeb 11–6, 9–11, 6–11, 11–8, 11–7, to win her second U.S. Open title.
 October 31 – November 6, 2015: 2015 Qatar Classic in  Doha
 Men:  Mohamed El Shorbagy defeated  Grégory Gaultier 11–5, 11–7, 5–11, 12–10, to win his second Qatar Classic title.
 Women:  Laura Massaro defeated  Nour El Sherbini 11–8, 12–14, 11–9, 8–11, 11–9, to win her first Qatar Classic title.
 December 1 – 6, 2015: 2015 Hong Kong Open
 Men:  Mohamed El Shorbagy defeated  Cameron Pilley 11–8, 11–6, 11–8, to win his second consecutive Hong Kong Open title. 
 Women:  Nicol David defeated  Laura Massaro 15–13, 11–9, 11–3. to win her tenth consecutive Hong Kong Open title. 
 January 7 – 14: 2016 Tournament of Champions in  New York City
 Men:  Mohamed El Shorbagy defeated  Nick Matthew 8–11, 11–6, 11–8, 6–11, 11–6, to win his second consecutive Tournament of Champions title.
 Women:  Nour El Sherbini defeated  Amanda Sobhy 11–4, 9–11, 12–10, 11–8, to win her first Tournament of Champions title.
 February 25 – March 2: 2016 Metro Squash Windy City Open in  Chicago
 Men:  Mohamed El Shorbagy defeated  Nick Matthew by retirement. The score was 11–6, 11–3, and 1–0. Therefore, El Shorbagy won his first Windy City Open title. 
 Women:  Raneem El Weleily defeated fellow Egyptian, Nour El Sherbini, 9–11, 11–6, 11–3, 11–6, to win her second consecutive Windy City Open title. 
 March 21 – 27: 2016 British Open Squash Championships in  Kingston upon Hull
 Men:  Mohamed El Shorbagy defeated fellow Egyptian, Ramy Ashour, 11–2, 11–5, 11–9, to win his second consecutive British Open Squash Championships title.
 Women:  Nour El Sherbini defeated fellow Egyptian, Nouran Gohar, 11–7, 9–11, 7–11, 11–6, 11–8, to win her first British Open Squash Championships title.
 April 24 – 29: 2016 El Gouna International 2016 in 
  Mohamed El Shorbagy defeated  Grégory Gaultier, 7–11, 9–11, 11–3, 11–9, 11–8, to win his first El Gouna International title.
 May 24 – 28: 2016 PSA World Series Finals in  Dubai
 Men:  Grégory Gaultier defeated  Cameron Pilley, 11–4, 11–5, 8–11, 11–6, to win his third PSA World Series Finals title.
 Women:  Laura Massaro defeated  Raneem El Weleily, 9–11, 11–6, 5–11, 12–10, 11–5, to win her first PSA World Series Finals title.

References

External links
 World Squash: official website of the World Squash Federation

 
Squash by year